Nakazawaea is a genus of yeast in the order Saccharomycetales. The relationship of this taxon to other taxa within the order is not fully unknown (incertae sedis). 

In 2022, DNA analysis of Saccharomycotina yeasts noted that Peterozyma toletana, Peterozyma tannophilus and Nakazawaea holstii are in a monophyletic sister clade to the Pichiaceae family.

Originally, a monotypic genus containing the single species Nakazawaea holstii but Nakazawaea siamensis was added in 2011. With further others added later.

The genus name of Nakazawaea is in honour of Dr. Ryoji Nakazawa, who was a Japanese microbiologist and Director of the Institute for Fermentation, Osaka, Japan, in recognition of his contributions to yeast taxonomy.

The genus was circumscribed by Yuzo Yamada, Kojiro Maeda and Kozaburo Mikata in Biosc., Biotechn. Biochem. vol.58 (Issue 7) on page 1256 in 1994.

Species
As accepted by GBIF;
 Nakazawaea ambrosiae 
 Nakazawaea anatomiae 
 Nakazawaea ernobii 
 Nakazawaea holstii 
 Nakazawaea ishiwadae 
 Nakazawaea laoshanensis 
 Nakazawaea molendini-olei 
 Nakazawaea peltata 
 Nakazawaea pomicola 
 Nakazawaea populi 
 Nakazawaea siamensis 
 Nakazawaea todaengensis 
 Nakazawaea wickerhamii 
 Nakazawaea wyomingensis

Uses
Nakazawaea molendini-olei is found in the yeast of Black olive pomace (remains), and is used to make oleuropein.

References

External links

Saccharomycetes
Ascomycota genera
Taxa described in 1994